Mario Gardelli (born 1908, date of death unknown) was a Brazilian football referee.

Career 
He officiated in the following major competitions: 
1949 South American Championship (5 matches)
1950 FIFA World Cup (1 match)

References
 

1908 births
Year of death missing
Brazilian football referees
Copa América referees
FIFA World Cup referees
1950 FIFA World Cup referees